Yao Wei may refer to:

Yao Wei (footballer) (born 1997), Chinese footballer
Yao Wei (dancer) (born 1984), Chinese dancer in the Royal Danish Ballet